Sir Robert Hildyard, 2nd Baronet (1671 – 30 November 1729), of Patrington and Winestead in the East Riding of Yorkshire, was an English landowner and Member of Parliament.

He was the eldest son of Christopher Hildyard; he succeeded to the baronetcy on the death of his grandfather, Sir Robert Hildyard, 1st Baronet on 7 March 1685. He served in Parliament as member for Hedon from December 1701 to July 1702. He was responsible for building Winestead Hall.

He was Lieutenant-Colonel commanding the East Riding Regiment of Militia at the time of the Jacobite rising of 1715.

Hildyard never married. On his death in 1729, the baronetcy passed to his nephew, Sir Robert Hildyard, 3rd Baronet.

References

 
 Hildyard genealogy

|-

1671 births
1729 deaths
Hildyard, Robert, 2nd Baronet
English MPs 1701–1702
Members of the Parliament of England for Hedon
British Militia officers
East York Militia officers